Kukulje may refer to:
 Kukulje (Srbac), a village in Srbac, Bosnia and Herzegovina
 Kukulje, Montenegro